Mary LeSawyer (October 8, 1917; Shamokin, Pennsylvania – June 13, 2004; Orlando, Florida) was an American opera singer of Ukrainian descent who had an active international career during the 1940s through the 1960s. A lyric soprano, LeSawyer studied opera at the Juilliard School before beginning her singing career. She had a long and fruitful partnership with the New York City Opera from 1949 through 1961. With the NYCO she appeared in Carmen, La Traviata, Madame Butterfly, and others. She notably took part in the company's celebrated 1960 national tour, performing in four American operas: The Ballad of Baby Doe, Street Scene, Susannah, and Six Characters in Search of an Author. In 1958 she created the role of Mrs. Muller in he world premiere of Robert Kurka's The Good Soldier Schweik for the NYCO at Lincoln Center.

LeSawyer was married for many years to Joseph LeSawyer, president of the Ukrainian National Association from 1961 to 1978, President Ford–Eastern Europe Advocates memcon (July 25, 1975). Mary was also active with the UNA and with the Ukrainian National Women's League of America. The couple lived in Scotch Plains, New Jersey before moving to Venice, Florida when they retired. They had no children.

References

1917 births
2004 deaths
American operatic sopranos
Juilliard School alumni
People from Shamokin, Pennsylvania
People from Scotch Plains, New Jersey
20th-century American women opera singers
Singers from New Jersey
Classical musicians from New Jersey
Singers from Pennsylvania
Classical musicians from Pennsylvania
American people of Ukrainian descent
21st-century American women